Mazaceae is a family of plants in the order Lamiales. The family was described by James L. Reveal in 2011. Genera in this family were most recently previously included in Phrymaceae and in older classifications were placed in Scrophulariaceae.

Germplasm Resources Information Network includes the following genera in the family:
Lancea
Mazus

The Angiosperm Phylogeny Website also includes the genus Dodartia.

References

 
Lamiales families